Deya Neya (English: Give and Take, released 1963) is a Bengali film directed by Sunil Bandopadhyay and starring Uttam Kumar and Tanuja in lead roles. This is a romantic comedy film which portrays a man's struggle on a light note and ends with a happy ending. The film was produced and composed by Shymal Mitra. The film was also loosely inspired by Shymal Mitra's real life. The film is noted for its outstanding music and generally the film became an all-time blockbuster hit.

Plot 
Prasanta Kumar Roy, son of BK Roy- an industrialist from the town of Lucknow, loves music and dislikes family business. His negligence towards work results in loss for the company. His enraged father comes home only to learn that his son is also secretly practicing music. He disapproves the idea. Prasanta leaves home in a bout and settles in one of his old bosom friend Asim's (Tarun Kumar) house in Calcutta (Kolkata). He starts singing there in radio and earns fame under the pseudonym of Abhijit Chowdhury. One day he suddenly comes across an anxious driver searching for a mechanic. He accompanies him to repair the car of a rich guy, Amrita Lal Majumder (Pahari Sanyal) where he meets Sucharita (Tanuja), niece of Amritalal, and falls in love with her. He decides to appoint himself as a mechanic cum driver for Amrita Lal Majumdar, who lives with his niece, and assumes the name Hridoy Haran (stealer of heart). Suchi is a smart girl but difficult to manage. Suchi also happens to be a great fan of singer Abhijit. She tries in various ways to meet Abhijit or to obtain a photograph of him, but singer Abhijit never gives any interview nor allows public display of photograph. Obtaining Asim's address from radio station as the sole contact address to Abhijit, Suchi visits them and gets friendly. She asks them to obtain a photo of Abhijit for her. In  one such visits, she almost caught Prasanta on the spot. When Prasanta learns that Suchi is in love for Abhijit he decides to leave the service.

Meanwhile, Mr BK Roy engages police to find his son as his mother falls ill while grieving for her son. Meanwhile, Sukanta, a close friend and talented lyricist suffers from tuberculosis and has to be operated immediately. Prasanta decides to appear publicly in a show to fundraise the cost of treatment. Meanwhile, Roy and his wife arrive in Calcutta looking for their son. A police person recognizes Prasanta and asks Roy to be in the theater hall. In the meantime, Suchi buys 1st row tickets to watch singer Abhijit live for first time. As the curtain unfolds, Suchi gets astonished as she recognizes the man on stage to be their mysteriously disappeared driver Hridoy Haran, and she feels humiliated while bursting into tears. Mr Roy watches public reactions to his son's song and decides to change his mind. Police asks Prasanta to meet his parents. Before leaving Prasanta asks Asim to explain everything and apologizes to Suchi on behalf of Prasanta. Strangely the police car stops at the house of Mr Amritlal Majumder - where he worked previously. It turns out that BK Roy and Amrit Lal are known to each other for a long time and in fact Roy family are staying there as guests.

Asim explained everything to Suchi, and Asim's wife proposes Suchi as bride for Prasanta to Mrs. Roy. But Amritlal rejects the proposal saying Prasanta is a driver and moreover his own driver. It turns out that he was joking and admits that he has no objection with the marriage, but only on one condition, that if Prasanta agrees to be a life time driver for Suchi.

Cast 
 Uttam Kumar as Prasanta Roy
 Tanuja as Sucharita Majumdar
 Pahari Sanyal as Amritalal Majumdar
 Kamal Mitra as BK Roy
 Chhaya Devi as Prasanta's mother
 Tarun Kumar as Asim Chatterjee
 Lily Chakravarty as Asim's wife
 Sumita Sanyal as Bishakha, Sucharita's friend
 Nripati Chattopadhyay
 Shyam Laha as Anumaan, Driver of Amritalal
 Premangshu Bose as Sukanta, Prasanta's friend

Production
The film score was written by its producer Shymal Mitra. For the lead actress role he want to cast Nutan at first. But she can't give date for Hindi films. Then Mitra was select Nutan's young sister Tanuja who made her debut in Bengali Cinema. In that time Uttam Kumar and Hemanta relationship was on bad so Shyamal Mitra chance to sang on Uttam leap.

Soundtrack

All the songs of the film became evergreen hits and remain popular to this day. They were one of the reasons of the success of the film.

Reception
The film became a huge success at the box office for its outstanding music. Every song became hugely popular and this was a breakthrough film for Shyamal Mitra who also was the playback singer for Uttam Kumar. The pair become popular after this film. After this Shyamal Mitra regularly sang on Uttam for the rest of his career

Remakes
In 1977 director producer Shakti Samanta remade this film as Anurodh, starring Rajesh Khanna, Simple Kapadia, Vinod Mehra, and Ashok Kumar.

References

External links

Bengali-language Indian films
1960s Bengali-language films